Llerena may refer to:

Llerena, Badajoz in Badajoz province, Spain, postal code 06900
Valverde de Llerena in the province of Badajoz, Extremadura, Spain
Higuera de Llerena in the province of Badajoz, Extremadura, Spain
Retamal de Llerena in the province of Badajoz, Extremadura, Spain
Campillo de Llerena in the province of Badajoz, Extremadura, Spain
Juan Llerena, San Luis, a village and municipality in San Luis Province in central Argentina

People 
Hernán Llerena (1928–2010), Peruvian cyclist
José Llerena (born 1967), Ecuadorian weightlifter
José A. Llerena, poet
Mario Llerena (1913–2006), Cuban revolutionary
Walter Llerena (born 1973), Ecuadorian weightlifter

See also
Calathea allouia, known as lerén or lairén in Spanish, and also known in English as Guinea arrowroot